Pseudorgyia versuta is a species of owlet moth (family Erebidae) first described by Leon F. Harvey in 1875. It is found in North America.

The MONA or Hodges number for Pseudorgyia versuta is 8512.

References

Further reading

 
 
 

Scolecocampinae
Articles created by Qbugbot
Moths described in 1875
Taxa named by Leon F. Harvey